Street Cinema is the first and only album by the American hip hop group Sporty Thievz.

Background
Street Cinema was released on August 18, 1998 through Ruffhouse Records and was co-produced by Ski and Sporty Thievz member King Kirk. The album was one of the final to be released through Ruffhouse, as the label was shut down less than a year later.

Chart-wise, the album did not make much of an impact, only making it to 66 on the Top R&B/Hip-Hop Albums and 16 on the Top Heatseekers.  The album's lead single, however, did. "No Pigeons" peaked at #12 on the Billboard Hot 100, giving the group their only top 40 hit during their brief existence, as well as #1 on the Hot Rap Singles. In addition to "No Pigeons", "Cheapskate" and its remix also became minor hits on the Billboard charts.

"No Pigeons" was certified gold by the RIAA on July 9, 1999 for sales of over 500,000 copies.

Reception

Allmusic gave the album a solid three out of a possible five stars, calling it "there's too much junk floating around the album to make the good stuff instantly recognizable. Still, that handful of good cuts makes the entire enterprise worth investigating once, even if you find that you won't return to this Street Cinema that often."

Track listing

Personnel

Darien Dash - executive producer
David Anthony Willis - producer (tracks 2-3, 5-7, 9-10, 13, 15), executive producer
Jane Blaze - vocals (track 8)
Joe Quinde - mixing, recording
Kevin Jerome Briggs - producer (track 16)
Kirk Howell - main artist, producer (tracks 4, 8, 10-12, 14)
Kibwe Dorsey - additional vocals (tracks 10, 14, 16)
Lynn Simon - additional vocals (track 3)
Manny Lecuona - mastering
Marlon Bryan - main artist
Mochell - additional vocals (track 8)
Percy L. Chapman - featured artist (track 7)
Peter Pankey - featured artist (track 13)
Phil Jordan - vocals (track 4)
Rashita Wallace - additional vocals (track 8)
Shaarod Ford - main artist
Stephen Henderson - executive producer

Charts

References

External links
[ Street Cinema] at Allmusic
Street Cinema at Discogs
Street Cinema at Tower Records
[ Street Cinema] at Billboard

1999 debut albums
Sporty Thievz albums
Columbia Records albums
Ruffhouse Records albums
Albums produced by Ski Beatz